The Crușov is a right tributary of the river Olt in Romania. It flows into the Olt in Tia Mare.

References

Rivers of Romania
Rivers of Olt County